Tarrant County is located in the U.S. state of Texas. As of 2020, it had a population of 2,110,640. It is Texas' third-most populous county and the 15th-most populous in the United States. Its county seat is Fort Worth. Tarrant County, one of 26 counties created out of the Peters Colony, was established in 1849 and organized the next year. It was named in honor of General Edward H. Tarrant of the Republic of Texas militia.

Geography

Adjacent counties
 Denton County (north)
 Dallas County (east)
 Ellis County (southeast)
 Johnson County (south)
 Parker County (west)
 Wise County (northwest)

Communities

Cities (multiple counties)

 Azle (partly in Parker County)
 Burleson (mostly in Johnson County)
 Crowley (small part in Johnson County)
 Fort Worth (small parts in Denton, Johnson, Parker and Wise counties)
 Grand Prairie (partly in Dallas County and a small part in Ellis County)
 Grapevine (small parts in Dallas, Denton counties)
 Haslet (small part in Denton County)
 Mansfield (small parts in Ellis and Johnson counties)
 Newark (mostly in Wise County)
 Reno (almost entirely in Parker County)
 Roanoke (almost entirely in Denton County)
 Southlake (small part in Denton County)

Cities

 Arlington
 Bedford
 Blue Mound
 Colleyville
 Dalworthington Gardens
 Euless
 Everman
 Forest Hill
 Haltom City
 Hurst
 Keller
 Kennedale
 Lake Worth
 North Richland Hills
 Pelican Bay
 Richland Hills
 River Oaks
 Saginaw
 Sansom Park
 Watauga
 Westworth Village
 White Settlement

Towns

 Benbrook
 Edgecliff Village
 Flower Mound (mostly in Denton County)
 Lakeside
 Pantego
 Trophy Club (mostly in Denton County)
 Westlake (small part in Denton County)
 Westover Hills

Census-designated places
 Briar (partly in Wise and Parker counties)
 Pecan Acres (small part in Wise County)
 Rendon

Historical census-designated places
 Eagle Mountain

Unincorporated communities

 Alliance (partly in Denton County)
 Avondale
 Boss
 Eagle Acres
 Lake Crest Estates
 Lake Forest
 Lake Shore Estates

Historical communities 
 Birdville
 Bisbee
 Bransford
 Center Point
 Ederville
 Garden Acres
 Handley
 Johnsons Station

Ghost towns
 Birds
 Dido
 Minters Chapel



Demographics

Note: the US Census treats Hispanic/Latino as an ethnic category. This table excludes Latinos from the racial categories and assigns them to a separate category. Hispanics/Latinos can be of any race.

As of the census of 2010, there were 1,809,034 people. Tarrant County is currently the second most populous county in the Dallas-Ft. Worth Metropolitan Statistical Area.  Non-Hispanic whites are believed to constitute about 46.7% of the county's population according to current population trends.

As of the census of 2000, there were 1,446,219 people, 533,864 households, and 369,433 families residing in the county. The population density was 1,675 people per square mile (647/km2). There were 565,830 housing units at an average density of 655 per square mile (253/km2). The racial makeup of the county was 71.2% White, 12.8% Black or African American, 0.6% Native American, 3.6% Asian, 0.2% Pacific Islander, 9.1% from other races, and 2.5% from two or more races. 19.7% of the population were Hispanic or Latino of any race.

There were 533,864 households, out of which 36.8% had children under the age of 18 living with them, 52.6% were married couples living together, 12.2% had a female householder with no husband present, and 30.8% were non-families. 24.9% of all households were made up of individuals, and 5.9% had someone living alone who was 65 years of age or older. The average household size was 2.67 and the average family size was 3.22. As of the 2010 census, there were about 5.2 same-sex couples per 1,000 households in the county.

In the county, the population was spread out, with 28.1% under the age of 18, 10.0% from 18 to 24, 33.5% from 25 to 44, 20.1% from 45 to 64, and 8.3% who were 65 years of age or older. The median age was 32 years. For every 100 females, there were 98.10 males. For every 100 females age 18 and over, there were 95.6 males.

The median income for a household in the county was $46,179, and the median income for a family was $54,068. Males had a median income of $38,486 versus $28,672 for females. The per capita income for the county was $22,548. About 8.0% of families and 10.6% of the population were below the poverty line, including 13.8% of those under age 18 and 8.7% of those age 65 or over.

Government, courts, and politics

Government 
Tarrant County, like all Texas counties, is governed by a Commissioners Court. The court consists of the county judge, who is elected county-wide and presides over the full court, and four commissioners, who are elected in each of the county's four precincts.

County Judge & Commissioners

County Officials

Constables

County services 
The JPS Health Network (Tarrant County Hospital District) operates the John Peter Smith Hospital and health centers.

Countywide law enforcement is provided by the Tarrant County Sheriff's Office and Tarrant County Constable's Office. All cities in the county provide their own police services, with three exceptions: Westlake contracts service from the Keller Police Department, and Haslet and Edgecliff Village contract service from the Sheriff's Office. DFW Airport, the Tarrant County Hospital District, and the Tarrant Regional Water District also provide their own police forces.

Since the disbandment of the North Tarrant County Fire Department, no countywide firefighting services exist. All municipalities provide their own fire departments. Most cities also operate their own ambulances, with two notable exceptions: Fort Worth and 14 other Tarrant County cities are served by the Metropolitan Area EMS Authority (MAEMSA), a governmental administrative agency established under an interlocal operating agreement and operating as MedStar Mobile Health, while the city of Arlington contracts paramedic apparatus from private entity American Medical Response.

Fire and EMS protection in unincorporated portions of Tarrant County is governed by the Tarrant County Emergency Services District #1, which administers contracts with 17 fire departments (including 10 with EMS response) and has mutual aid agreements with eight additional fire departments.

CareFlite air ambulance services operate from Harris Methodist Hospital in Fort Worth.

Courts

Justices of the Peace

County criminal courts

County civil courts

County probate courts

Criminal district courts

Civil district courts

Family district courts

Juvenile district court

Politics
Since the 1950s, Tarrant County has been fairly conservative for an urban county, and one of the most populous Republican-leaning counties in the nation. However, it elected Democrat Jim Wright to 17 terms (1955-1989) as U.S. Congressman and Speaker of the House (1987-1989), and Wright was succeeded by fellow Democrat Pete Geren (1989-1997).

In 2018, the Democratic Party rebounded to represent a larger portion of the political profile and made huge gains in Tarrant County, concentrated in several areas throughout the county: eastern Euless, Grand Prairie and eastern and southern Arlington, northern and western areas of Mansfield, large portions of Fort Worth, particularly the area surrounding the Stockyards and Meacham Airport, southern and eastern Fort Worth, especially in dense metro areas and along I-35W, and Forest Hill.

Republicans are dominant in many of the rural areas of the county, downtown and western Fort Worth and north of Loop 820, and almost all suburban areas including Benbrook, rural Mansfield areas and western Arlington, Haltom City, Mid-Cities (Hurst, Euless, and Bedford), and the northern suburbs.

Beginning in 1952, the majority of voters supported the Republican Party presidential candidate in every election except 1964, when Tarrant County voted for the Lyndon B. Johnson-Hubert Humphrey Democratic ticket, then again in 2020 when the Joe Biden-Kamala Harris Democratic ticket carried the county.  In 2016, Donald Trump-Mike Pence won Tarrant with 51.7% of the vote, the worst showing for Republicans since the Bob Dole-Jack Kemp ticket in 1996 won by a margin of 8.6%, and closest since 1976 when Gerald Ford-Bob Dole carried the county by less than 1% over the Jimmy Carter-Walter Mondale ticket.

The first Republican elected to the State Senate from Tarrant County since Reconstruction was Betty Andujar in 1972.

The county has leaned Republican in United States Senate races since Democrat Lloyd Bentsen's 1988 victory, but in the 2018 election Democratic candidate Beto O'Rourke carried Tarrant, though losing statewide to incumbent Ted Cruz.

In 2020, Joe Biden carried the county with 49.3% (to Donald Trump's 49.1%) in the 2020 presidential election, the first win for a Democratic presidential ticket in Tarrant County since Texas native Lyndon B. Johnson in 1964 and the closest race in the county since 1976, which was won by the razor thin margin of 1,826 votes (The margin of votes in 2020, in comparison, was 1,836 votes). Many other suburban Texas counties, including Tarrant's immediate neighbors in Denton County and Collin County as well as those around Houston and Austin, have shown similar trends since 2016.

From the 1893 beginning of U.S. House District 12, there have been two Republicans in 127 years elected to the U.S. House for the western half of Tarrant County; from the 1875 inception of U.S. House District 6, there have been three Republicans in 145 years elected to the U.S. House for the eastern portion of Tarrant County, including former congressman and senator Phil Gramm's election as both a Democrat and a Republican after he switched parties in 1983 to run for re-election.

State Board of Education members

Texas State Representatives

Texas State Senators

United States House of Representatives

Education

Colleges and universities

Under the Texas Education Code, Tarrant County is the entire official service area of Tarrant County College (formerly Tarrant County Junior College).

Universities in Tarrant County include:
 University of Texas at Arlington
 Texas Christian University (Fort Worth)

Primary and secondary schools

Public schools in Texas are organized into independent school districts and charter schools. Tarrant County is also home to dozens of private high schools and nearly 100 lower-level private schools.

Independent school districts
Those serving the county include:

 Arlington Independent School District
 Birdville Independent School District
 Carroll Independent School District
 Castleberry Independent School District
 Eagle Mountain-Saginaw Independent School District
 Everman Independent School District
 Fort Worth Independent School District
 Grapevine-Colleyville Independent School District (most)
 Hurst-Euless-Bedford Independent School District
 Keller Independent School District
 Kennedale Independent School District
 Lake Worth Independent School District
 White Settlement Independent School District
 Aledo Independent School District (partial)
 Azle Independent School District (partial)
 Burleson Independent School District (partial)
 Crowley Independent School District (partial)
 Godley Independent School District (partial)
 Lewisville Independent School District (partial)
 Mansfield Independent School District (partial)
 Northwest Independent School District (partial)

Masonic Home Independent School District formerly served a part of the county. In 2005 it merged into FWISD.

Charter schools

 Arlington Classics Academy
 Fort Worth Academy of Fine Arts
 IDEA Public Schools
 Harmony Public Schools
 Newman International Academy
 Texas School of the Arts
 Treetops School International
 Uplift Education (partial)
 Westlake Academy

Private schools

 Colleyville Covenant Christian Academy
 Fort Worth Christian School
 Fort Worth Country Day School
 Lake Country Christian School
 Nolan Catholic High School
 The Oakridge School
 Southwest Christian School
 Temple Christian School
 Trinity Baptist Temple Academy
 Trinity Valley School

Transportation

Major highways

Airports
Dallas/Fort Worth International Airport is partially in the cities of Grapevine and Euless in Tarrant County and Irving in Dallas County.

Billed as the world's first purely industrial airport, it was developed in a joint venture between the City of Fort Worth, the Federal Aviation Administration and Hillwood Development Company, a real estate development company owned by H. Ross Perot Jr. Alliance Airport has 9600' and 8200' runways.

Fort Worth Meacham International Airport is located at the intersection of Interstate 820 and U.S. Business Highway 287 in northwest Fort Worth, 5 miles from the downtown business district. Meacham International Airport has two parallel runways.

Fort Worth Spinks Airport is located 14 miles south of the downtown business district. The airport is located at the intersection of Interstate-35W and HWY 1187 and serves as a reliever airport for Fort Worth Meacham International Airport and Dallas–Fort Worth International Airport.

See also

 List of museums in North Texas
 National Register of Historic Places listings in Tarrant County, Texas
 Recorded Texas Historic Landmarks in Tarrant County

References

External links
 Tarrant County official website
 Tarrant County in Handbook of Texas Online from The University of Texas at Austin
 Tarrant County profile from The County Information Project

 
Dallas–Fort Worth metroplex
1850 establishments in Texas
Populated places established in 1850
Majority-minority counties in Texas